Hambarsoom Grigorian (1893 in Tabriz - July 28, 1975 in Tehran) was an Iranian composer of Armenian descent, and the founder and director of the “Komitas” choir.

References 

Iranian people of Armenian descent
1893 births
1975 deaths